Gun laws in Guam regulate the sale, possession, and use of firearms and ammunition in Guam, an unincorporated territory of the United States. As Guam is a territory of the United States, many U.S. federal laws apply, as well as Constitutional rulings and protections.

Summary table

Open Carry 
A Firearms ID card, valid for 3 years from date of issue, allows possession and open carry of all legal firearms in Guam.  One may open carry handguns or long guns.

Concealed carry 
Guam was previously a may-issue jurisdiction, and generally approved very few permits (~50/year). Bill 296-32 was introduced by senators Tony Ada, Aline Yamashita, Chris Duenas, Tommy Morrison, Rory Respicio, Brant McCreadie and Michael San Nicolas, which after it was signed by Governor Eddie Calvo converted Guam to be a shall-issue jurisdiction. Guam is in the United States Court of Appeals for the Ninth Circuit and therefore the ruling in Peruta v. San Diego is in effect, which one of the sponsors cited as a reason for the proposed law.

References

Government of Guam

Guam